Hong Kong is a live album by Jean-Michel Jarre, and released in 1994 on Disques Dreyfus, licensed to Polydor. Even though the album is called Hong Kong and has pictures of the event on its booklet, most of the tracks are from the Europe in Concert venues, except for "Souvenir of China" which is a special mix consisting of the Paris la Defense version and the actual track played in Hong Kong. Also, "Fishing Junks at Sunset" was recorded from the Hong Kong concert rehearsals. Some of the tracks already featured on the VHS release of the Barcelona concert the year before.
 
The running order is incorrect from both the Hong Kong show and the concerts in Europe from which the recordings were taken. For example Band in the Rain was actually always performed before Oxygene 4, not Rendez-Vous 4 as on the CD. The intro of Oxygene 4 can be heard in the background as the track fades out into Rendez-Vous 4 on the CD.

The non-album track ‘Digi Sequencer’ is included on the CD, having been performed for the first time during the Europe concerts. This is the only official audio release of the track to date.

Track listing

The first version released in 1994 included two CDs but since the 1997 remasters, the album has been issued on one CD, with "Hong Kong Hostess" and "Fishing Junks at Sunset - Part 1" removed.

First edition – original track list (1994)

Disc 1
 "Countdown" – 1:37 
 "Chronologie 2" – 6:37 
 "Chronologie 3" – 5:46 
 "How Old Are You?" – 1:17 
 "Équinoxe 4" – 4:46 
 "Souvenir of China" – 4:43 
 "Qu'est-ce-que l'amour?" – 0:52 
 "Chronologie 6" – 5:10 
 "Chronologie 8" – 4:49 
 "Where Are You Going?" – 0:52 
 "Oxygène 4" – 4:32

Disc 2
 "Hong Kong Hostess" – 0:35 
 "Fishing Junks at Sunset - Part 1" – 6:09 
 "Fishing Junks at Sunset - Part 2" – 5:31 
 "Sale of the Century" – 1:18 
 "Digi Sequencer" – 6:07 
 "Magnetic Fields 2" – 6:31 
 "Band in the Rain" (unplugged) – 2:26 
 "Rendez-Vous 4" – 6:23 
 "Chronologie 4" – 6:35

Second edition (1997 remaster)
 "Countdown" – 1:37 
 "Chronologie 2" – 6:37 
 "Chronologie 3" – 5:46 
 "How Old Are You?" – 1:17 
 "Equinoxe 4" – 4:46 
 "Souvenir of China" – 4:43 
 "Qu'est-ce-que l'amour?" – 0:52 
 "Chronologie 6" – 5:10 
 "Chronologie 8" – 4:49 
 "Where Are You Going?" – 0:52 
 "Oxygene 4" – 4:32 
 "Fishing Junks at Sunset" - Part 2" – 5:31 
 "Sale of the Century" – 1:18 
 "Digi Sequencer" – 6:07 
 "Magnetic Fields 2" – 6:31 
 "Band in the Rain" (unplugged) – 2:26 
 "Rendez-Vous 4" – 6:23 
 "Chronologie 4" – 6:35

Personnel
 Jean-Michel Jarre – Keyboards and synthesizers 
 Francis Rimbert – Keyboards 
 Dominique Perrier – Keyboards 
 Sylvain Durand – Keyboards 
 Laurent Faucheux – Drums 
 Dominique Mahut – Percussions 
 Michel Valy – Bass guitar (actually Guy Delacroix from the Europe concerts on most tracks) 
 Patrick Rondat – Guitars 
 Chuen Ying Arts Centre of Hong Kong – Chinese orchestra 
 Cheng Chai-man – Conductor 
 Hong Kong Opera Society – Choir 
 Julie Lecrenais – Child soprano 
 Miranda – Voice of time

References

External links
 Hong Kong at Jarre UK

Jean-Michel Jarre live albums
1994 live albums